Takara was a Japanese toy and video game company that is now part of Takara Tomy.

Takara may refer to:

People
Kathryn Waddell Takara (born 1943), American poet
Marcio Takara, Brazilian comic book artist

Other uses
Takara (band), an American rock band
Takara (whale), a killer whale living at SeaWorld San Antonio
Takara, Central African Republic, a village in the Bamingui-Bangoran Prefecture
Takara Holdings, a Japanese company that produces beverages, food, medical and computer supplies
Takara (surname), a Japanese surname